Rioverde is a coastal town in northwestern Ecuador. It is the seat of the Río Verde Canton.

References

Populated places in Esmeraldas Province
Populated coastal places in Ecuador
Populated places established in 1996
1996 establishments in Ecuador